Caira Moreira-Brown (born June 11, 1996) is a US epee fencer who was a member of the United States fencing team for the junior Pan American Games where she took home a bronze in individuals and gold in teams in 2015 in Toronto, Canada. Moreira Brown was born and raised in New York City. She began fencing at the age of 15 after being introduced to it by her cousins, Keeth and Erinn Smart, both Olympic Silver medalist, in different weapons. Before taking up fencing, she had taken ballet, ice skating, tennis and track. Similar to both of her cousins she began and has continued fencing at The Peter Westbrook Foundation.Whose founder, Olympic saber bronze-medalist Peter Westbrook, has been one of her mentors.

Moreira Brown graduated from an all girls private school on the upper east in 2014 where she went to continue on as a division 1 athlete at St. John's University in Queens. The next year Moreira Brown transferred to The Ohio State University in Columbus, OH and continues as a division 1 athlete.

References

American female fencers
1996 births
Living people
Place of birth missing (living people)
21st-century American women